Adam Mizrahi (born April 19, 1985) is an Israeli footballer currently playing for Nordia Jerusalem.

Honours
Israeli Third Division (2):
2010-11, 2014–15

References

External links
 

1985 births
Living people
Israeli footballers
Hapoel Jerusalem F.C. players
Beitar Tel Aviv Bat Yam F.C. players
Hapoel Kfar Saba F.C. players
Maccabi Yavne F.C. players
Beitar Givat Ze'ev F.C. players
Hapoel Katamon Jerusalem F.C. players
Nordia Jerusalem F.C. players
Liga Leumit players
Footballers from Jerusalem
Israeli people of Iraqi-Jewish descent
Association football forwards